Barakapur is a village in Muzaffarpur district, Bihar state, India. According to the 2011 Indian census, its population was 2,093 people (1,088 males, 1,005 females).

References 

Villages in Muzaffarpur district